Gogan may refer to:

 Good Governance Ambassadors of Nigeria
 Gugan, a city in East Azerbaijan Province, Iran
 Gogan, Mureș, a village in the commune Bahnea, Mureș county, Romania
 Gogan, Rongelap, an islet in Rongelap atoll, Marshall Islands